Eastaugh is a surname. People with that surname include:

Frederick Orlebar Eastaugh (1913–1992), son-in-law of R. E. Robertson, and partner in Robertson's law firm
John Eastaugh (1920–1990), Anglican bishop
Robert L. Eastaugh (born 1943), justice of the Alaska Supreme Court
Simon Eastaugh (born 1973), Australian rules footballer
Stephen Eastaugh (born 1960), Australian contemporary artist

See also
Eastaugh, or Lyng Eastaugh, a hamlet in Lyng, Norfolk
Cyril Easthaugh (1897–1988), British Anglican bishop whose family had previously been named Eastaugh